Walking Shadow is the 21st Spenser novel by Robert B. Parker.

Plot
The story follows Boston-based PI Spenser as he tries to solve the on-stage murder of an actor in the run-down town of Port City.  While investigating the crime, he runs afoul of the local Chinese mob and uncovers a web of infidelity, organized crime, and psychologically unstable actors.

Recurring characters
Spenser
Hawk
Vinnie Morris
Dr. Susan Silverman, Ph.D.
Sgt. Frank Belson, Boston Police Department
Healy

In other media

The novel was made into a 2001 TV movie, starring Joe Mantegna as Spenser.

Cast
 Joe Mantegna as Spenser
 Marcia Gay Harden as Susan
 Ernie Hudson as Hawk
 Eric Roberts as Police Chief DeSpain
 Christopher Lawford as Jimmy Christopholous
 Tamlyn Tomita as Rikki Wu

References
 from the author's website
 

1994 American novels
Spenser (novel series)
American novels adapted into films
American novels adapted into television shows